Scott Ross (born November 20, 1951) is an American digital media executive with a career spanning three decades. In the 1980s he led George Lucas' companies and in 1993 he founded, along with James Cameron and Stan Winston, Digital Domain, Inc., one of the largest digital production studios in the motion picture and advertising industries.

In the 1980s Ross was general manager of Lucasfilm's Industrial Light and Magic (ILM) and under his leadership, ILM won five Academy Awards for Best Visual Effects (Who Framed Roger Rabbit, Innerspace, Terminator 2: Judgment Day, The Abyss, Death Becomes Her). The company re-organized in 1991 and Ross was named senior vice president of the LucasArts Entertainment Company, which comprised Skywalker Sound, LucasArts Commercial Productions, LucasArts Attractions, EditDroid/SoundDroid and ILM.

Under Ross' direction, from 1993 to 2006, Digital Domain garnered two Academy Awards and three nominations, receiving its first Oscar in 1997 for the ground-breaking visual effects in Titanic. That was followed by a second Oscar for What Dreams May Come.  Digital Domain received additional nominations for True Lies, Apollo 13 and I, Robot and won three Scientific and Technical Academy Awards for its proprietary software.

Digital Domain's Commercials Division has established itself as the premier visual effects studio in the advertising industry.  With Fortune 500 clients such as Nike, American Express, Gatorade, Anheuser-Busch, Coca-Cola and Mercedes Benz, the Commercials Division has garnered dozens of Clio Awards. In addition to the visual effects divisions, Mr. Ross launched Digital Domain Films, a feature film production division.  The first feature film produced by Ross was the New Line Cinema release Secondhand Lions which achieved both critical and box office success. In 2006, as Digital Domain's CEO and Chairman, Ross sold Digital Domain to Wyndcrest Holdings led by film director, Michael Bay, and his partner John Textor.  

At present, Ross sits on multiple boards and is an advisor to companies and schools such as the Beijing Film Academy, Lenovo Computers, DeTao Masters Academy in Shanghai, Eyellusion (a holographic live concert touring production company) and is a co-founder of Trojan Horse Was A Unicorn.
the world's leading digital artist conference which takes place in Malta. Ross also continues developing film screenplays that focus on the pressing issues of the day.

A native of New York City, Ross began his career in media studies at Hofstra University, where he graduated with a BS in communication arts in 1974.  He returned to Hofstra in June 1997 to receive an honorary doctorate degree from his alma mater. Ross is a member of the Academy of Motion Picture Arts and Sciences (OSCARS) and the Academy of Television Arts and Sciences (EMMYS). He has worked on over 100 of the world's largest special effects films and has lectured extensively about the creative process, content and technology in over 30 countries around the world.

Controversy 
Ross had a falling out with his co-founder, James Cameron, over a conflict of interest whereby Cameron insisted, as co-owner of Digital Domain, that it continue working overtime on Titanic leading the company close to bankruptcy. Although he achieved some success in producing Secondhand Lions, other productions including "Instant Karma", "Plant Life", "Shadowplay", and "A Thousand Cranes" remain in Hollywood development hell.

References

External links 
 Official website of Digital Domain
 Official website of Scott A Ross
 
 Official website of Trojan Horse Unicorn
 Pixel wizards: meet the unsung heroes bringing your favourite films to life
 Digital Domain Co-Founder Scott Ross Reveals Plan for "Burning Man Meets TED" VFX Festival
 Scott Ross in Beijing: “China is Making Big Mistakes”
 How does one make a million dollars in the movie business?
 China: the new Hollywood?
 Visual Effects Society Listing
 Scott Ross on the Visual Effects Business: "It Has Gotten Worse"
 Scott Ross Talks the Flawed Economics of VFX at FMX 2015

1951 births
Living people
Hofstra University alumni
Businesspeople from New York City
Industrial Light & Magic people